Elliott Bernerd (born 23 May 1945) is a British property developer, the co-founder of the property company Chelsfield with Sir Stuart Lipton.

Early life
He was born in Maida Vale, London on 23 May 1945, the only child of a film producer father. His parents divorced when he was 7. He was educated at various schools, leaving Davies Tutorial College, Holland Park, at the age of 15.

Career
Aged 15, Bernerd went to work for Dorrington Investment Trust, with his heart "set on a career in property".

In 1983 he began the development of Stockley Park in west London (he paid £8 million for the site; in 1988, the development sold for £365 million, of which £20 million went to Bernerd). In 1986, he co-founded Chelsfield, which, in 1988, bought Wentworth Golf Club for £17.7 million (also reported as £20 million). Bernerd sold 40% of the club to Japanese investors, raising £32 million, in 1989. In 2004, Chelsfield sold the remaining 60% share, as Richard Caring bought the club for £130 million.

In 1993, Chelsfield acquired the Merry Hill Shopping Centre project, putting up £35 million, alongside £120 million from a group of Saudi Arabian investors (from whom Bernerd received a £6 million finder's fee). Chelsfield later bought out the Saudi investors. By 2004, Merry Hill's value was close to £2 billion.

In 2008, the Qatar Investment Authority purchased a 20% stake in Bernerd's property group, Chelsfield, which owned London's Camden Market.

According to Institutional Investor, Bernerd was a client of a Jersey-based offshore trust company La Hougue which engaged in tax minimisation through legal as well as illegal loopholes and other avoidance measures.

Personal life
He had two adult daughters with his ex-wife, from whom he was divorced sometime before 1992. His daughter Tara Bernerd is a London-based interior designer.

In 1993, Bernerd was living in Surrey, with his third wife.

References

1945 births
British businesspeople
Living people